Godinești may refer to:

 Godinești, a commune in Gorj County, Romania
 Godinești, a village in the commune Zam, Hunedoara County, Romania
 Godineștii de Jos, a village in the commune Vultureni, Bacău County, Romania
 Godineștii de Sus, a village in the commune Vultureni, Bacău County, Romania
 Godinești, the Romanian name for the commune Hodynivka, Chernivtsi Oblast, Ukraine
 Godinești (river), a tributary of the Berheci in Bacău County, Romania